A dado (US and Canada), housing (UK) or trench (Europe) is a slot or trench cut into the surface of a piece of machinable material, usually wood. When viewed in cross-section, a dado has three sides. A dado is cut across, or perpendicular to, the grain and is thus differentiated from a groove which is cut with, or parallel to the grain. Dados are often used to affix shelves to cabinetry bodies. Similar to the dado, see rabbet (rebate).

Variations
 A through dado involves cuts which run between both edges of the surface, leaving both ends open.
 A stopped or blind dado ends before one (stopped) or both (blind) of the cuts meets the edge of the surface.
 A half dado is formed with a narrow dado cut into one part, coupled with a rabbet of another piece. This joint tends to be used because of its ability to hide unattractive gaps due to varying material thicknesses.

See also
 Dado set
 Woodworking joints

References

Dado|Housing|Trench